Ida Elise Broch (born 25 June 1987) is a Norwegian actress. She is the half-sister of Nicolai Cleve Broch and Christian Cleve Broch. Broch played Catherine in the film The Man Who Loved Yngve and had a starring role in the film Switch. She had a featured role in season 3 of the Netflix series Lilyhammer and starred in the Norwegian TV series The Third Eye, where she played police detective Mari Friis. She has also starred in two Netflix festive-themed series, Home for Christmas and A Storm for Christmas, as the lead role and as part of an ensemble cast respectively.

Education
Broch has performed in plays since elementary school and studied drama at Hartvig Nissen School and Romerike Folk High School. She left school in the spring of 2007 in order to begin filming The Man Who Loved Yngve and joined the Norwegian National Academy of Theatre in the autumn of 2008.

Filmography

 Bakkeflyvere (short) (2006)
 Switch (2007), as Nina
 The Man Who Loved Yngve (2008), as Cathrine Halsnes
 Twende (short) (2008), as Ella
 Amor (short) (2009), as Julie
 Pax (2010), as Elise
 Dark Souls (2011), as Maria
 Conqueror (TV series) (2012), as Kristin
 Detective Downs (2013), as Isabel Star
 Lilyhammer (2014), as Birgitte
 The Third Eye (2014), as Mari Friis
 Home for Christmas (Hjem til jul ) (2019–2020) as Johanne
 A Storm for Christmas (2022)
 Fenris (TV series) (2008), as Emma Salomonsen (2022)

Awards 

 Gullruten 2015 as "Best Actress" for her role in Lilyhammer

References

External links

Ida Elise Broch - personal YouTube channel
Ida Elise Broch - profile and photos on Filmweb (in Norwegian)
Ida Elise Broch – Mannen som elsket Yngve (in Norwegian)

1987 births
Living people
Actresses from Oslo